Idlebrain.com is an Indian entertainment website that features information, news, and reviews on Telugu cinema. It is one of the oldest websites on the Internet focusing on Telugu films. The site is especially popular for its film reviews written by the founder Jeevi. It was founded in 1999 by G. V. Ramana (better know by his nom de plume Jeevi), a graduate of BITS Pilani, with the help of his friend Sunil Krishna.

As of August 2022, it has an archive of nearly 1000 Telugu films reviewed by Jeevi starting with Iddaru Mitrulu (1999). The site features entertainment news, reviews, box office results, trailers, interviews, movie schedules, chat room, photo galleries and other features related to Telugu cinema. It is considered to be among the most popular websites related to Telugu film industry.

History 
G. V. Ramana (born ), popularly known by his nom de plume Jeevi, is a graduate of BITS Pilani who had short stints in software and finance firms. While he was working in a private firm in Mumbai, his only connection with Telugu cinema was stray magazines. At that time, for a cinephile like him staying outside Andhra Pradesh, latest information related to Telugu films was scarce and hard to find and so he decided to launch a website.

In December 1999 he launched Idlebrain.com, a website covering Telugu cinema, with the help of his friend Sunil Krishna who was based in Sunnyvale, California. Initially, Sunil hosted the site on his home computer. Jeevi used to contribute to the fledgling site personally while also keeping his dayjob.

Armed with a digital camera, Jeevi used to stop on roads and click at wayside billboards with eye-catching posters and upload them on his site. In the summer of 2001, he resigned from his job and started working on the website fulltime. In about a year, Jeevi started interacting with producers for getting the latest information from official sources. Producers like Shyam Prasad Reddy, K. S. Rama Rao, Chalasani Ramesh, and Sravanthi Ravi Kishore evinced interest regarding the information on the website.

Jeevi also started writing reviews of films on the site. As of October 2008, he reviewed over 500 Telugu films and 100 Hindi films. His reviews quickly became popular in the industry and among movie buffs. His review format covers assessment of a film's plot, actors' performance, music, cinematography, and other technical aspects.

In October 2008 Jeevi claimed that Idlebrain had about one lakh daily visitors, with about 40% of them from the US and 50% from metros in India.

Reception 
In August 2002, Geetanath V. of The Hindu opined that the website was "not only colourful, but also has several attractive features contrary to its name". It added that Idlebrain.com was the most happening among the various film websites.

In April 2006, Y. Sunita Chowdhary of The Hindu called Idlebrain.com "a leading player in its segment."

In its October 2008 issue, lifestyle magazine Hyderabad Josh noted that Idlebrain is popular among the NRI community especially in the US. It further mentioned that Idlebrain had a sizeable following among movie buffs in metropolitan cities of India like Hyderabad, Mumbai, Delhi, Chennai, Pune, and Bangalore.

In August 2009, CNBC TV18 wrote, "Idlebrain is an online Telugu movie ready reckoner for film buffs who find themselves working in a distant land." It also noted, "While most film websites run on industry gossip, what strikes you about Idlebrain.com is information about overseas screenings for Telugu expats starved of their regular dose of popular movie stars. Jeevi's reviews are particularly popular among the Telugu NRI community, so much so that DVD rental prices are decided based on his ratings."

The website won the Andhra Pradesh Cinegoers’ Association award for the Best Telugu Film website in 2008. It has been noted by distributors that Jeevi's reviews affect the box office performance of films in the overseas market and the DVD rental prices are decided based on his ratings.

In the 2017 book Revisiting Star Studies: Cultures, Themes and Methods edited by Sabrina Qiong Yu, Professor of Film and Chinese Studies at Newcastle University, Idlebrain.com is mentioned as a pioneer of a major shift in Telugu cinema in which the public consumption of film information widened from print media to internet and digital media.

References 

Indian film websites
Film review websites
Internet properties established in 1999
Telugu cinema
1999 establishments in India